Gösebek is a river of Schleswig-Holstein, Germany. It flows into the Baltic Sea in Scharbeutz.

See also
List of rivers of Schleswig-Holstein

Rivers of Schleswig-Holstein
 
Rivers of Germany